Everything Under the Sun is the second studio album by American power pop band, Jukebox the Ghost. The album was released on September 7, 2010 through Yep Roc Records.

Track listing

Personnel 
Jukebox the Ghost
 Jesse Kristin — Drums, Group Member, Percussion
 Tommy Siegel — Group Member, Guitar, Vocals
 Ben Thornewill — Group Member, Keyboards, Piano, Vocals

Production and recording
 Greg Calbi — Mastering
 Christopher Ferrino — Photography
 Greg Giorgio — Engineer
 Peter Katis — Engineer, Mixing, Producer
 Cindi Peters — Production Coordination
 Carolyn Wachnicki — Artwork

Charts

References 

2010 albums
Jukebox the Ghost albums
Yep Roc Records albums
Albums produced by Peter Katis